Svensson's copper underwing (Amphipyra berbera) is a moth of the family Noctuidae. The species was first described by Charles E. Rungs in 1949. It is distributed throughout Europe including Russia east to the Urals.

This species has a wingspan of 47–56 mm, the female usually larger than the male. The forewings are brown, marked with pale fascia and a dark-centred pale stigma. The hindwings are bright copper-coloured. This species is very similar to the copper underwing (Amphipyra pyramidea) but can usually be distinguished by the pattern on the underside of the hindwings: A. pyramidea has a pale central area, contrasting strongly with darker margins; A berbera is much more uniformly coloured. See Townsend et al.

A. berbera flies at night from July to September  and is attracted to light and strongly to sugar.

The larva feeds on a range of trees and shrubs (see list below). The species overwinters as an egg.

  The flight season refers to the British Isles. This may vary in other parts of the range.

Recorded food plants

Acer - sycamore maple
Carpinus - hornbeam
Populus - aspen
Quercus - oak
Rhododendron
Salix - willow
Sorbus - rowan
Syringa - lilac
Tilia - lime
Wisteria - wisteria sinensis

References

External links

Fauna Europaea
 Taxonomy
Lepiforum e.V. Includes photo of genitalia.

Amphipyrinae
Moths described in 1949
Moths of Europe
Moths of Asia